Tereza Králová (born 22 October 1989) is a Czech athlete specialising in the hammer throw. She represented her country at two World Championships, in 2013 and 2015 without qualifying for the final.

Her personal best in the event is 70.21 metres in Kladno in 2013.

Competition record

References

Czech female hammer throwers
Living people
1989 births
World Athletics Championships athletes for the Czech Republic
Competitors at the 2013 Summer Universiade
Competitors at the 2015 Summer Universiade
Competitors at the 2017 Summer Universiade
Sportspeople from Brno
21st-century Czech women